Georgios Christodoulou (born 17 August 1997) is a Cypriot football player. He plays for Anagennisi Deryneia.

Club career
He made his Cypriot First Division debut for APOEL on 19 December 2015 in a game against Pafos.

On 25 July 2019, Christodoulou returned to Anagennisi Deryneia.

References

External links
 

1997 births
Living people
Cypriot footballers
Cyprus youth international footballers
Cyprus under-21 international footballers
APOEL FC players
Anagennisi Deryneia FC players
Pafos FC players
Ermis Aradippou FC players
Cypriot First Division players
Association football midfielders